Hoyt Henry Wheeler (August 30, 1833 – November 19, 1906) was an associate justice of the Vermont Supreme Court and later a United States district judge of the United States District Court for the District of Vermont.

Education and career
Wheeler was born on August 30, 1833, in Chesterfield, New Hampshire, a son of John Wheeler and Roxana (Hall) Wheeler.  He was raised and educated in Chesterfield and Newfane, Vermont, including attendance at the Chesterfield Academy, where he later taught.  He also taught at schools in Dummerston, Vermont, Newfane, Townshend, Vermont and Westminster, Vermont.  Wheeler began to study law while teaching,  and learned under the tutelage of attorneys Charles K. Field, Jonathan Dorr Bradley and George Bradley Kellogg.  He was admitted to the bar in 1859, and practiced in Jamaica from 1859 to 1867, first in partnership with John E. Butler, then as senior partner with Lavant M. Reed.  A Republican, he was a member of the Vermont House of Representatives in 1867.  He was a member of the Vermont Senate from 1868 to 1869.  He was an associate justice of the Vermont Supreme Court from 1869 to 1877, succeeding Justice John Prout.

Federal judicial service
Wheeler was nominated by President Rutherford B. Hayes on March 15, 1877, to a seat on the United States District Court for the District of Vermont vacated by Judge David Allen Smalley.  According to contemporary accounts, Wheeler had not sought the appointment, but received it because he had made a favorable impression on Hayes when Hayes visited Newfane. (Hayes's family was originally from nearby Dummerston.) He was confirmed by the United States Senate on March 16, 1877, and received his commission the same day.  He retired in October 1906, following the confirmation of James Loren Martin as his successor.

Death and burial
Wheeler died in Brattleboro on November 19, 1906.  He was buried at Morningside Cemetery in Brattleboro.

Family
In 1861, Wheeler married Minnie L. Maclay of Lockport, New York.  They had no children, but raised as their own a nephew, John Knowlton, the son of Mrs. Wheeler's sister Elizabeth and her husband Benjamin L. Knowlton.

Honors
In 1886, Wheeler received the honorary degree of LL.D. from the University of Vermont.

References

Sources

Books

Newspapers

External links
 
 

1833 births
1906 deaths
People from Chesterfield, New Hampshire
Vermont lawyers
Republican Party members of the Vermont House of Representatives
Republican Party Vermont state senators
Justices of the Vermont Supreme Court
Judges of the United States District Court for the District of Vermont
United States federal judges appointed by Rutherford B. Hayes
19th-century American judges
Burials in Vermont
United States federal judges admitted to the practice of law by reading law